Honda Marine is an American company headquartered in Alpharetta, Georgia. Honda Marine is part of "Honda’s Power Products" division. They build a full line of four-stroke outboard marine engines. They were the second U.S. company to build a four-stroke marine outboard engine. They manufactured the first marine engine in 1964. Many of the engine concepts and technologies are taken from their automotive engines used in popular vehicles such as the Accord and Odyssey. The BF115, 130, and 150 engines uses a power head based on the same 2.4L K24 VTEC engine used in the Honda Accord. The BF200, 225, and 250 use engines derived from Honda's J35A series of engines used in larger vehicles such as Pilot, Odyssey, and Ridgeline. Honda offered a five-year no-declining warranty on their engines. Honda expanded its well known Variable Valve Timing & Lift Electronic Control (VTEC) technology to marine engines in the 2000s. VTEC varies the lift and duration of the intake valve opening, enhances performance at both low and high RPM. It provides a broad, flat torque curve and smooth power delivery. Their full lineup of engine models are of four-stroke design.

Products

Mid-range models (25HP – 100HP) 2019

High-powered models (115HP – 250HP) 2019

References

External links 
 
1964 establishments in Georgia (U.S. state)
Marine engine manufacturers